Tosham is a town and a Gram Panchayat on the foot of Tosham Hill range in Bhiwani district in the Indian state of Haryana. It has been awarded the title of "Adarsh Village". It is situated in the foothill of Tosham hill range of Aravali Mountain Range. The hill has several historic places, such as forts, carvings, paintings, temples, sacred ponds, dating as far back 1800 years. It is a rural area.

The mountain an important biodiversity area within the "western-southern Haryana" spur of the Northern Aravalli leopard wildlife corridor, but remains at due to the polluting and ecologically destructive unsustainable mining activities.

History

Early and medieval history 
Tosham was under Gupta rule in the 4th Century as per the inscription. History of Tosham dates back to at least the 4th century, as evident by the Sanskrit language Tosham rock inscription at Tosham hill. Later it came under Tomar during the rule of Anangpal Tomar and then Chauhan Rajput rulers during the rule of Prithviraj Chauhan who built the Baradari, before falling into the hands of Delhi Sultanates, Mughal Empire, Shekhawati and British Raj. Pre-Indus Valley Civilization mine, smelt and houses have been found at Khanak hills of Tosham Hill range

Post-independence 
According to the data maintained by the Government of India's Department of Statistics, following were established at Tosham:

 Public Health Engineering Department (1970)
 Haryana Police station (1970)
 Public Works Department(1972)
 Agricultural produce market committee (1972)
 Tosham rural development block and BDO office (1975)
 Haryana Roadways bus stand (1975)
 Telephone exchange (1980)
 Tosham Jindal public school (1993)
 Tehsil office (1995)
 Government girls senior secondary school, Tosham (1995)

Demographics 
 India census, Tosham had a population of 11,271. Males constitute 53% of the population and females 47%. Tosham has an average literacy rate of 64%, higher than the national average of 59.5%: male literacy is 72%, and female literacy is 54%. In Tosham, 14% of the population is under 6 years of age.

Geography 

It has an average elevation of 207 metres (679 feet).

Tosham tehsil

There are total 108 villages in Tosham tehsil where the main villages are:

 Bahal
 Baganwala
 Dhani Mah
 Dulheri
 Indiwali
 Isharwal
 Jhanwari
 Khanak
 Kharkari Makhwan
 Laxmanpura
 Miran
 Nigana Kalan
 Sagwan

Tosham hills range 
Tosham Hill range or Tosham Wala Pahad: larger and taller of two hills, to the immediate south of Tosham town with roughly 200-meter-high spur mountain of Aravalli Range, with a full view of nearby villages and greenery all around. It has many temples in this some of them are Baba Mungipa, Hanuman temple, and seasonal Paleo waterfall.

Tosham Hill Fort 

There are also remains of a medieval fort wall in the ruined condition present on top of the Tosham hill, said to be from the times of Prithviraj Chauhan major part of which was destroyed in 1982 when an aircraft crashed on the fort. Its remnants still exist.

Tosham rock inscription 

Two interesting antiquities are to be seen in the neighborhood of Tosham. A baradari and another Sanskrit inscription on a rock on the face of the hill to the west of the town. The Toshām rock inscription is an epigraphic record documenting the establishment of a monastery and the building of water tanks for followers of the Sātvata religion. Found in Tosham, Haryana (India), It is not dated but can be assigned to the early fifth century CE. The inscription records the lineage and building activities of a line of Sātvata religious preceptors (ācārya) dating to the 4th and 5th centuries CE. This is an important record for the history of the Vaiṣṇava faith. The kinship and clan position of the Sātvatas is described in the article on the Yadavas. It does not appear to have been as yet satisfactorily translated. It seems to refer to a Scythian king Tushara who appears to have conquered the Gupta Galotkacha who reigned from about A. D. 50 to A. D. 79 and is referred to in the inscription. There appears to be evidence to show that the Tosham hill was a monastery of Buddhist monks or Bhikshus. The date of the inscription is said to be A. D. 162–224.

Tosham rock paintings 
In 2013, rudimentary rock paintings (supposedly circa 5th century CE) at the site of Tosham rock inscription were discovered. These rock painting included several figures, such as a royal family, a saint, and dinosaur-like creature.

Vaman statue 
Tosham Vaman statue, a 1,000 years old 60 kg carved red stone statue dating back to 8th to 10 century, of Vaman incarnation of Hindu deity Vishnu was found atop Tosham hill in January 2018 while policemen protecting the Haryana Police wireless repeater antennae system were clearing the rubble to clean the water tank there.
 In March 2018, this statue was relocated to the Jahaj Kothi Zonal Museum at Hisar.

Prithvi Raj Ki Katchery 
Prithvi Raj Ki Katchery is a Baradari on a small 80 meter Baradari hill in the northwest corner or Tosham town. According to the folklore it is said to be built by the 12th century Rajput king Prithviraj Chauhan whose rule had covered Tosham. He had regional setup administration at Asigarh Fort (present-day Hansi). The Baradari has 12 doors, 3 on each side. According to the folklore, it is where Rajput king Prithviraj Chauhan use to preside over the court proceedings to pass judgment.

Tosham Temple Complex

Panch Teerth Temple 
The temple is on the Tosham Hill.

Baba Mungipa Mandir 
Baba Mungipa Mandir (temple) at Tosham hill is a very famous temple of the Tosham area. Temple has a great following and people visiting this temple believe that wishes will be fulfilled by the Baba. The temple is a Samadhi of Mungipa. Sodha Mungipa laid himself in the samadhi as he believed that he killed the cow during meditation. Tourists can reach this site from the eastern side by climbing up to the Tosham hill. Moreover, tourists can see the domed structure where a large number of food grains and oils are offered. Visitors can also explore the water pool in a cavern and a Shiva temple that lies in proximity. Folklore has it that Baba Mungipa was a contemporary of Buddha.

Sacred Sulphur Ponds of Tosham Hill 

There are several holy ponds on Tosham Hill inside the caves, namely Pandu Teerth Kund, Surya Kund, Kukkar Kund, Gyarasia/Vyas Kund, and a reservoir or a small tank on the summit of the hill to store rainwater. Water in these kunds (ponds) in various caverns contain sulfur which is considered sacred by the devotees and pilgrimages as it heals skin diseases.

Pandu Tirath, Tosham 
There are several sacred kunds or reservoirs on the hill; one of them, the Pandu Tirath, is considered so sacred that some of the neighboring villages deposit the ashes of their dead in it instead of taking them to the Ganges.

Surya Kund, Tosham 
The Surya Kund is one of many kunds (pond) found in caverns of Tosham hill. It is considered sacred.

Kukkar Kund, Tosham 
The Kukkar Kund is one of many kunds (pond) found in caverns of Tosham hill. It is considered sacred.

Gyarasia Kund, Tosham 

The Gyarasia Kund (Vyas Kund) is one of many kunds (pond) found in caverns of Tosham hill. It is considered sacred.

Parks

Tosham lake 
Tosham lake is a wetland area inhabited by many birds and animals also have a landscaped park. It is located near Government Girls College and new bus stand. Before the establishment of to sham lake. There was a pond there and on its shore, there was a temple of hanuman that exists until now.
Tosham

Ch. Surender Singh Memorial Herbal Park, Tosham 
Ch. Surender Singh Memorial Herbal Park, Tosham is a herbal park set up to preserve and propagate the endangered herbs. It also aims to educate people and farmers in the commercial cultivation of these herbs to engage in profitable pursuits.

Interesting infrastructure

Police Telecomm Tower 
Haryana Police has wireless repeater antennae in three locations, at Tosham Hill range in Bhiwani district, Takdi hill in Rewari district, and at Sarahan hill in Himachal Pradesh. Police HQ uses Sarahan tower to transmit signals to Tosham Hill. Tosham Hill tower boosts and sends the signal to Takdi Hill. Tosham Hill tower covers the area of the signal of Bhiwani, Hisar, Fatehabad, Sirsa, Rohtak, and Jhajjhar District Police Headquarters. Take Hill tower covers the Gurugram, Faridabad, Palwal, Nuh, Rewari, Narnaul and Haryana Bhawan Delhi.

Civil Court Tosham 
Civil Court was established on 18/04/2017 at Tosham near the BDPO office. The first judicial officer was Sh. Sunil Dewan ACJ Cum SDJM, Tosham, and secondly Sh. Saurabh Gupta is presently seating Judge at Civil Court Tosham. Prabhu Ram was the first president of Advocate, Bar Association Tosham, and Sh. Dharambir Singh Siwach was the first elected Secretary of Bar Association Tosham. Now Sh. Jitender Singh Chahal is the president of Advocates, Bar Association Tosham, and Sh. Sanjay Baganwala is presently secretary of Bar Association Tosham, elected on 22/12/2016.

References 

Cities and towns in Bhiwani district
Forts in Haryana